The End of the Beginning is a 2009 album produced by Canadian singer-songwriter Jonathan Seet.

Track listing
 "The End Of The Beginning" – 4:12
 "If The Last Kiss Made You Cry" – 2:24
 "Down By The Bay" – 6:05
 "Who Is The Man" – 3:45
 "Lost In The Crowd" – 3:14
 "Stranger In Your Room" – 2:41
 "The Lost Week" – 4:36
 "Night Bird" – 2:16

Jonathan Seet albums
2009 EPs